Aphaca may refer to:

 Afqa, a municipality in Lebanon
 Lathyrus aphaca, a pea of family Fabaceae